Kernville Union Elementary School District is a public school district based in Kern County, California, United States.

References

External links
 

School districts in Kern County, California